Forkhead box S1 is a protein that in humans is encoded by the FOXS1 gene.

Function

The forkhead family of transcription factors belongs to the winged helix class of DNA-binding proteins. The protein encoded by this intronless gene contains a forkhead domain and is found predominantly in aorta and kidney. The function of the encoded protein is unknown. [provided by RefSeq, Jul 2008].

References

Further reading 

Forkhead transcription factors